Shock Trauma may refer to:

A trauma center
CALSTAR (California Shock Trauma Air Rescue)
R Adams Cowley Shock Trauma Center, Baltimore, Maryland
Shock Trauma Air Rescue Service, Calgary, Alberta

See also
 Shocktrauma, a 1982 Canadian television film